Gigglesnort Hotel is a syndicated children's television program which ran for 78 episodes between 1975 and 1978. It was hosted by Bill Jackson, previously the host of several Chicago-based children's programs including Clown Alley and The BJ and Dirty Dragon Show. The program was set, as the title implies, at an old hotel, where Jackson's role was a desk clerk. The program featured many of the characters from the previous show, including Dirty Dragon, the Old Professor, Weird, Old Mother Plumtree, and several others who were created just for the program, such as the hotel's owner, Old Man Gigglesnort.

The show was widely praised by critics, and it became one of the highest-rated children's shows in WLS-TV history. It was syndicated in 1978, airing in several markets nationwide as well as Canada, Italy, and Saudi Arabia.

Jackson made a final appearance for a presentation for the Museum of Broadcast Communications, "Saturday Morning with B.J. and Dirty Dragon: Bill Jackson, Live in Person—One Last Time", in December 2009, saying this would be his last time appearing as a performer. In 1995, he donated all his original puppets to Chicago's Museum of Broadcast Communications.

References

Bibliography
 via Project MUSE

External links

DirtyDragon.com
Gigglesnort Hotel at TVParty!
RealLans.com—Blog entries from one of the puppeteers
BJ & Dirty Dragon Photo Gallery Chicago Tribune

1970s American children's television series
American television shows featuring puppetry
1975 American television series debuts
1978 American television series endings
English-language television shows
Chicago television shows
Fictional hotels